The 1984 United States presidential election in Georgia took place on November 6, 1984. All 50 states and the District of Columbia, were part of the 1984 United States presidential election. Georgia voters chose 12 electors to the Electoral College, which selected the president and vice president of the United States.

Georgia was won by incumbent United States President Ronald Reagan of California, who was running against former Vice President Walter Mondale of Minnesota. Reagan ran for a second time with former C.I.A. Director George H. W. Bush of Texas, and Mondale ran with Representative Geraldine Ferraro of New York, the first major female candidate for the vice presidency. Georgia had been 1 of just 6 states that voted against Reagan in 1980, but with Jimmy Carter not on the ballot, President Reagan cruised to victory in Georgia, even winning Sumter County where Carter's hometown, Plains is located. This was the first presidential election in Georgia where a candidate earned more than 1 million votes.

The presidential election of 1984 was a very partisan election for Georgia, with just under 100% of the electorate voting either Democratic or Republican, and only those 2 parties appearing on the official ballot. All of Georgia's counties gave either Reagan or Mondale an absolute majority of the vote, with the great majority going to Reagan. However, Mondale received 76% of the vote in Hancock County, making it his fourth strongest county in the country outside the District of Columbia.

Georgia weighed in for this election as 2% more Republican than the national average. The 1984 Presidential Election in the state of Georgia marked the first time a winning candidate won over a million votes in Georgia. , this is the last election in which Randolph County, Clarke County (home to Athens and the University of Georgia), and DeKalb County voted for a Republican presidential candidate.

Reagan won Georgia in a convincing 20.4% landslide, as he became the second nominee of either party (and the second Republican nominee ever, after Nixon in 1972) to sweep the states of the Old Confederacy since 1944. Georgia weighed in for this election as 2.3% more Republican than the nation at large. Georgia was one of thirty states, mostly in the South and Mountain and Plains West, in which Reagan cracked 60% of the vote. Reagan's strong performance in Georgia was a strong contrast with 1980, when Georgia was the only state to give its native son, incumbent President Jimmy Carter, an outright majority. With Carter not on the ticket, the all-Northern ticket of Mondale and Ferraro sank in Georgia. Even Carter's home county of Sumter County opted for Reagan.

Unlike McGovern in 1972 (who failed to carry a single county in the state), however, Mondale did have some substantial pockets of strength in the Peach State, mostly in Fulton County (Atlanta), as well as in Georgia's section of the Black Belt. Reagan did well in most of the rest of rural Georgia, although Mondale was able to garner over a third, or in some cases even over 40%, of the vote in counties in which the Democratic vote share has sunk to under a quarter of the vote in the 21st century. Reagan did particularly well in the growing Atlanta suburban counties of Gwinnett and Cobb, which gave him his second- and third-best vote shares in the state, respectively, and which may have found his positions on reducing taxes and regulations appealing. These counties had already abandoned Carter in 1980 despite Carter still fairly comfortably carrying the state that year.

Democratic platform
Walter Mondale accepted the Democratic nomination for presidency after pulling narrowly ahead of Senator Gary Hart of Colorado and Rev. Jesse Jackson of Illinois – his main contenders during what would be a very contentious Democratic primary. During the campaign, Mondale was vocal about reduction of government spending, and, in particular, was vocal against heightened military spending on the nuclear arms race against the Soviet Union, which was reaching its peak on both sides in the early 1980s.

Taking a (what was becoming the traditional liberal) stance on the social issues of the day, Mondale advocated for gun control, the right to choose regarding abortion, and strongly opposed the repeal of laws regarding institutionalized prayer in public schools. He also criticized Reagan for what he charged was his economic marginalization of the poor, stating that Reagan's reelection campaign was "a happy talk campaign," not focused on the real issues at hand.

A very significant political move during this election: the Democratic Party nominated Representative Geraldine Ferraro to run with Mondale as vice-president. Ferraro is the first female candidate to receive such a nomination in United States history. She said in an interview at the 1984 Democratic National Convention that this action "opened a door which will never be closed again," speaking to the role of women in politics.

Republican platform

By 1984, Reagan was very popular with voters across the nation as the President who saw them out of the economic stagflation of the early and middle 1970's, and into a period of (relative) economic stability.

The economic success seen under Reagan was politically accomplished (principally) in two ways. The first was initiation of deep tax cuts for the wealthy, and the second was a wide-spectrum of tax cuts for crude oil production and refinement, namely, with the 1980 Windfall profits tax cuts. These policies were augmented with a call for heightened military spending, the cutting of social welfare programs for the poor, and the increasing of taxes on those making less than $50,000 per year. Collectively called "Reaganomics", these economic policies were established through several pieces of legislation passed between 1980 and 1987.

These new tax policies also arguably curbed several existing tax loopholes, preferences, and exceptions. Reaganomics has (along with legislation passed under presidents George H. W. Bush and Bill Clinton) been criticized by many analysts as "setting the stage" for economic troubles in the United States after 2007, such as the Great Recession.

Virtually unopposed during the Republican primaries, Reagan ran on a campaign of furthering his economic policies. Reagan vowed to continue his "war on drugs," passing sweeping legislation after the 1984 election in support of mandatory minimum sentences for drug possession.  Furthermore, taking a (what was becoming the traditional conservative) stance on the social issues of the day, Reagan strongly opposed legislation regarding comprehension of gay marriage, abortion, and (to a lesser extent) environmentalism, regarding the final as simply being bad for business.

Results

Results by county

See also
 Presidency of Ronald Reagan

Notes

References

Georgia
1984
1984 Georgia (U.S. state) elections